The Clemson Tigers men's basketball teams of 1920–1929 represented Clemson Agricultural College in NCAA college basketball competition.

1919–20

1920–21

1921–22

The Tigers began play in the Southern Conference.

1922–23

1923–24

1924–25

1925–26

1926–27

1927–28

1928–29

References

Games: 
Coaches & captains: 

1920